Vitaliy Stanislavovych Koval (born 28 July 1981  in Berezne, Rivne oblast) is a Ukrainian entrepreneur and politician.  Vice-president of the Ukrainian Wrestling Association. Member of the National Olympic Committee of Ukraine.

Head of the Rivne Regional State Administration since September 9, 2019 Governor of Rivne Oblast.

Biography 
In 2003, he graduated from Ternopil National Economic University. In 2017, received an MBA from the Lviv Business School of the Ukrainian Catholic University.

Koval worked in the banking sector (2004—2006). 2006—2019 – headed enterprises in agriculture, transport and construction.

2004–2006 – in the credit department of OJSC Ukrgasbank. 

From 2008 to 2009 he was the director of Probank Consult LLC, Vyshneve (Kyiv region).

2012–2014 – General Director of Investtradeservice LLC, Kyiv. 

Since 2014 – General Director of Sanako LLC (Kyiv), since 2015 – General Director of BBB Montazh (Kyiv).

Candidate for Master of Sports in Greco-Roman Wrestling.  He heads the public association "Rivne Regional Federation of Greco-Roman Wrestling". First Vice-President of the All-Ukrainian Federation of Greco-Roman Wrestling.

He is a member of the National Olympic Committee of Ukraine.

Vitaliy  Koval is the Deputy chairman of the board of the All-Ukrainian Road Association.

Koval is married and has two daughters.

References

External links 
 
 

1981 births
Living people
People from Rivne Oblast
Ternopil National Economic University alumni
Ukrainian Catholic University alumni
Governors of Rivne Oblast
Independent politicians in Ukraine
21st-century Ukrainian businesspeople
21st-century Ukrainian politicians